Fabian Kauter (born 22 September 1985) is a Swiss right-handed épée fencer and two-time Olympian.

Kauter competed in the 2012 London Olympic Games and the 2016 Rio de Janeiro Olympic Games.

Kauter won a bronze medal in the individual men's épée event and a bronze medal in the team men's épée event at the 2011 World Fencing Championships in Catania, Italy, a bronze medal in the individual men's épée event at the 2013 World Fencing Championships in Budapest, Hungary, a bronze medal in the team men's épée event at the 2014 World Fencing Championships in Kazan, Russia, and a bronze medal in the team men's épée event at the 2015 World Fencing Championships in Moscow, Russia.

Kauter won a bronze medal in the individual men's épée event at the 2007 European Fencing Championships in Ghent, Belgium.

Between 2011 and 2015, Kauter won two FIE Men's Épée Grand Prix titles, in addition to a silver medal and two bronze medals.

Between 2011 and 2014, Kauter won a FIE Men's Épée World Cup title, in addition to two silver medals and three bronze medals.

Personal life
Kauter's first sport was football, but a series of injuries lead him to turn to another sport. He took up fencing at age ten. His father, Christian Kauter, is a two-time Olympic medalist, and his brother, Michael Kauter, is a former Olympic fencer, both in épée.

Kauter also pursues a musical career under the artist name YuRi. He released in 2009 his first album Summer in Sibirie, followed in 2012 by Kopf über Wasser. In 2013, he co-founded "I believe in you", a crowdfunding platform for sport projects in Switzerland.

Medal Record

World Championship

European Championship

Grand Prix

World Cup

References

Swiss male épée fencers
1985 births
Living people
Olympic fencers of Switzerland
Fencers at the 2012 Summer Olympics
Fencers at the 2016 Summer Olympics
Universiade medalists in fencing
Sportspeople from Bern
Universiade gold medalists for Switzerland
Universiade bronze medalists for Switzerland
World Fencing Championships medalists
Medalists at the 2009 Summer Universiade